Torrs Hydro is a micro hydroelectric scheme, owned by the community, in New Mills, Derbyshire.
It is located on the River Goyt, immediately after its confluence with the River Sett at the Torr weir. A 2.4-metre diameter steel trough screw turbine generates up to 63 kW of electricity.


History 

Torr weir was built across the Goyt, to provide a head for the Torr Mill which occupied the same site. Torr Mill burnt down in 1912.

On 20 September 2007 Torrs Hydro New Mills Limited, an Industrial and Provident Society for the Benefit of the Community was formed. £100,000 of capital was raised from 200 members. Construction began in March 2008, and on 8 June the screw was delivered. It weighs 11 tonnes. Commissioning started in August and the scheme was handed over on 4 September 2008. Torrs Hydro has an agreement to sell its electricity to The Co-operative Group which uses it to power its businesses, including its Co-op Food branch in New Mills.

See also 
 Settle Hydro, a similar scheme in North Yorkshire

References

External links 

 Torrs Hydro Website
 Torrs Hydro Prospectus
 Western Renewable Energy 

Hydroelectric power stations in England
Buildings and structures in Derbyshire
Power stations in the East Midlands
New Mills